August Hanko may refer to:
 August Hanko (military personnel) (unknown date of birth and death), German flying ace during WW I
 August Hanko (politician) (1879–1952), Estonian politician